Irene Mulvey is an American mathematician.

Mulvey completed her doctoral dissertation, titled Periodic, Recurrent and Non-Wandering Points for Continuous Maps of the Circle at Wesleyan University in 1982, where she was advised by Ethan Coven. She was appointed to a professorship at Fairfield University in 1985. In July 2020, Mulvey was elected president of the American Association of University Professors, succeeding Rudy Fichtenbaum.

References

20th-century American mathematicians
21st-century American mathematicians
Fairfield University faculty
Wesleyan University alumni
American women mathematicians
Year of birth missing (living people)
Living people
20th-century American women
21st-century American women